The Kalur Chert is a geologic formation in Albania. It contains fossils dated to the late Bajocian to mid Oxfordian of the Jurassic.

See also 
 List of fossiliferous stratigraphic units in Albania
 Han-Bulog Formation
 Vigla Formation

References 

Geologic formations of Albania
Jurassic System of Europe
Bathonian Stage
Bajocian Stage
Callovian Stage
Oxfordian Stage
Chert
Paleontology in Albania